East Ghouta inter-rebel conflict may refer to:
East Ghouta inter-rebel conflict (April–May 2016)
East Ghouta inter-rebel conflict (April–May 2017)